The iPad Air (4th generation), informally referred to as iPad Air 4, is a tablet computer designed, developed, and marketed by Apple Inc. It was announced by Apple on September 15, 2020. Pre-orders began on October 16, 2020, and shipping began a week later on October 23, 2020 alongside the iPhone 12 and iPhone 12 Pro. The device closely resembles the design of the 11-inch iPad Pro (3rd generation) and has several features that were previously exclusive to the iPad Pro line, such as support for Magic Keyboard and the second-generation Apple Pencil. It is available in five colors: Space Gray, Silver, Rose Gold, Green, and Sky Blue.

The 4th generation iPad Air was discontinued on March 8, 2022, following the announcement of its successor, the 5th generation iPad Air.

Features

Hardware 
There are 11.9 billion transistors inside of the Apple A14 Bionic SoC, which allows for higher efficiency in terms of both power and performance. The chip has a 6-core CPU that is 40 percent faster than the A12, a 4-core GPU that is 30 percent faster, and Apple's 16-core Neural Engine, which is twice as fast and features improved machine learning. The Neural Engine can process more than 11 trillion operations per second.

It has a wider 60Hz 10.9-inch 2360 by 1640 Liquid Retina Display display with 3.8 million pixels. The display is laminated and has an anti-reflective coating, as well as featuring wide color and True Tone.

The Home Button is removed; the Touch ID sensor has been relocated to the Sleep/Wake button attached on the top right edge of the device. Landscape stereo audio effect is also added to the system's audio recording system.

It features a rear 12MP camera capable of 4K video recording at up to 60fps as well as a 7MP FaceTime camera capable of 1080p 60fps video.

Connectivity 
With the release of its fourth-generation iPad Air, Apple discontinued the proprietary Lightning port in favor of a universal USB-C port that is used for charging as well as connecting external devices and accessories. The port is capable of transferring up to 5 Gbit/s (625 MB/s), allowing for fast connections to cameras and external storage, as well as support for monitors with up to 4K resolution. For wireless connection, the device comes with Bluetooth 5.0 and WiFi 6 (802.11ax).

Accessories 
It is compatible with the second generation of Apple Pencil, Magic Keyboard for iPad, and Smart Keyboard Folio.

Reception 

Apple's fourth-generation iPad Air has drawn criticism for being more expensive than its predecessor. In general, though, the iPad Air 4 has been widely praised by consumers and tech reviewers alike, with Henry T. Casey of Tom's Guide saying it is "the best tablet for most people" and "one of the best iPads ever," and with James Peckham of TechRadar calling it "a phenomenally well-made tablet." PCMag.com included the iPad Air (4th generation) in its Best Tech Products of the Year list in 2020 and awarded it their Editors' Choice for high-end tablets.

During the COVID-19 pandemic, Apple was praised for keeping Touch ID integrated into the power button instead of Face ID, as Face ID is unable to work when a user is wearing a face covering because they cover half of the face.

Timeline of iPad models

References 

Air 4
IOS
Tablet computers
Touchscreen portable media players
Tablet computers introduced in 2020